Nate DiCasmirro (born September 27, 1978) is a Canadian-born Italian former professional ice hockey right winger who was born in Atikokan, Ontario, but grew up in Burnsville, Minnesota, a suburb of Minneapolis. He most notably played in the American Hockey League and for the Italian national team.

Personal life 
He holds dual Canadian and U.S. citizenship and is of Italian descent.

Career 
DiCasmirro left home as a teenager to play midget AAA hockey in Marquette, Michigan, and later played for St. Cloud State University.  He was signed as a free agent in 2002 by the Edmonton Oilers and was sent to play in the minor leagues. In 2006, he signed as an unrestricted free agent with the Boston Bruins and was assigned to play right wing for the Providence Bruins of the American Hockey League (AHL).  On December 6, 2007, he was traded to the Phoenix Coyotes along with a 5th round draft pick in the 2009 NHL Entry Draft for goaltender Alex Auld.

He played several seasons in the AHL and then with Bolzano HC in the Italian Serie A, before being released on December 25, 2008. DiCasmirro then signed a short-term contract to play with Swedish team Timrå IK on January 6, 2009. Having played ten games for the Elitserien team, he continued his visit to Sweden by signing for HockeyAllsvenskan newcomers Örebro HK on September 11, 2009.  He moved later in the season to the Austrian Hockey League for EC VSV and in 2010 he signed for Brunico in Serie A.

On August 23, 2015, DiCasmirro returned to the Austrian EBEL, signing for a second stint with Italian club, HC Bolzano, as a free agent on a one-year contract.

Following his seventeenth professional season at the conclusion of the 2018–19 campaign playing with EC KAC second tier Alps Hockey League team, DiCasmirro opted to conclude his career with the intention to remain within EC KAC as a junior coach on March 25, 2019. In 2021, he was hired by the Minnesota Wild to be an assistant coach with their AHL affiliate, the Iowa Wild.

Career statistics

Regular season and playoffs

International

Awards and honors

References

External links 
 

1978 births
American men's ice hockey right wingers
American people of Italian descent
Bolzano HC players
Brunico SG players
Canadian emigrants to the United States
Canadian ice hockey right wingers
Canadian people of Italian descent
Italian ice hockey right wingers
Naturalised citizens of Italy
Edmonton Road Runners players
EC VSV players
Grand Rapids Griffins players
Hamilton Bulldogs (AHL) players
Ice hockey people from Ontario
Living people
North Iowa Huskies players
Örebro HK players
People from Burnsville, Minnesota
People from Rainy River District
Providence Bruins players
San Antonio Rampage players
St. Cloud State Huskies men's ice hockey players
Sheffield Steelers players
Syracuse Crunch players
Timrå IK players
Toronto Roadrunners players
HC Valpellice players
Canadian expatriate ice hockey players in England
Canadian expatriate ice hockey players in Austria
Canadian expatriate ice hockey players in Italy
Canadian expatriate ice hockey players in Sweden
Canadian expatriate ice hockey players in Slovenia
American expatriate ice hockey players in England
American expatriate ice hockey players in Austria
American expatriate ice hockey players in Italy
American expatriate ice hockey players in Sweden
American expatriate ice hockey players in Slovenia
Italian expatriate sportspeople in England
Italian expatriate sportspeople in Austria 
Italian expatriate sportspeople in Slovenia
Italian expatriate ice hockey people
HDD Jesenice players
EC KAC players
Naturalised sports competitors